Cancer Prevention Research is a peer-reviewed medical journal that publishes original studies, reviews, and commentaries in the fields of cancer prevention and interception. It was launched in 2008 by its publisher, the American Association for Cancer Research. The journal's current editors-in-chief are Raymond N. DuBois and Michael N. Pollak, who were appointed in 2018.

References

External links

American Association for Cancer Research academic journals
Oncology journals
Publications established in 2008
Semi-monthly journals
English-language journals